The 1981–82 Boston Celtics season was the 36th season of the Boston Celtics in the National Basketball Association (NBA). The Celtics entered the season as the defending NBA champions. They finished the season with the best record in the NBA.

Draft picks

Roster

Regular season

Season standings

Record vs. opponents

Game log

Regular season

|- align="center" bgcolor="#ccffcc"
| 1
| October 30
| Washington
| W 124–100
|
|
|
| Boston Garden
| 1–0
|- align="center" bgcolor="#ffcccc"
| 2
| October 31
| @ Milwaukee
| L 103–119
|
|
|
| MECCA Arena
| 1–1

|- align="center" bgcolor="#ccffcc"
| 3
| November 4
| Chicago
| W 115–93
|
|
|
| Boston Garden
| 2–1
|- align="center" bgcolor="#ccffcc"
| 4
| November 6
| Indiana
| W 111–94
|
|
|
| Boston Garden
| 3–1
|- align="center" bgcolor="#ccffcc"
| 5
| November 7
| @ Detroit
| W 129–88
|
|
|
| Pontiac Silverdome
| 4–1
|- align="center" bgcolor="#ccffcc"
| 6
| November 10
| @ Washington
| W 90–84
|
|
|
| Capital Centre
| 5–1
|- align="center" bgcolor="#ccffcc"
| 7
| November 11
| Kansas City
| W 115–100
|
|
|
| Boston Garden
| 6–1
|- align="center" bgcolor="#ccffcc"
| 8
| November 13
| New Jersey
| W 111–97
|
|
|
| Hartford Civic Center
| 7–1
|- align="center" bgcolor="#ccffcc"
| 9
| November 14
| @ Cleveland
| W 92–91
|
|
|
| Richfield Coliseum
| 8–1
|- align="center" bgcolor="#ccffcc"
| 10
| November 17
| @ Chicago
| W 98–95
|
|
|
| Chicago Stadium
| 9–1
|- align="center" bgcolor="#ffcccc"
| 11
| November 18
| Houston
| L 104–106
|
|
|
| Boston Garden
| 9–2
|- align="center" bgcolor="#ccffcc"
| 12
| November 20
| Milwaukee
| W 112–89
|
|
|
| Boston Garden
| 10–2
|- align="center" bgcolor="#ccffcc"
| 13
| November 25
| Golden State
| W 122–101
|
|
|
| Boston Garden
| 11–2
|- align="center" bgcolor="#ccffcc"
| 14
| November 27
| Washington
| W 113–100
|
|
|
| Boston Garden
| 12–2
|- align="center" bgcolor="#ccffcc"
| 15
| November 28
| @ Atlanta
| W 98–90
|
|
|
| The Omni
| 13–2

|- align="center" bgcolor="#ffcccc"
| 16
| December 1
| @ Indiana
| L 87–90
|
|
|
| Market Square Arena
| 13–3
|- align="center" bgcolor="#ccffcc"
| 17
| December 2
| Detroit
| W 115–114
|
|
|
| Boston Garden
| 14–3
|- align="center" bgcolor="#ccffcc"
| 18
| December 4
| Philadelphia
| W 111–103
|
|
|
| Boston Garden
| 15–3
|- align="center" bgcolor="#ffcccc"
| 19
| December 5
| @ New York
| L 83–103
|
|
|
| Madison Square Garden
| 15–4
|- align="center" bgcolor="#ccffcc"
| 20
| December 9
| New Jersey
| W 109–100
|
|
|
| Boston Garden
| 16–4
|- align="center" bgcolor="#ccffcc"
| 21
| December 11
| Atlanta
| W 94–86
|
|
|
| Hartford Civic Center
| 17–4
|- align="center" bgcolor="#ffcccc"
| 22
| December 12
| @ Atlanta
| L 97–108
|
|
|
| The Omni
| 17–5
|- align="center" bgcolor="#ccffcc"
| 23
| December 16
| Dallas
| W 109–92
|
|
|
| Boston Garden
| 18–5
|- align="center" bgcolor="#ccffcc"
| 24
| December 18
| @ Washington
| W 99–98
|
|
|
| Capital Centre
| 19–5
|- align="center" bgcolor="#ffcccc"
| 25
| December 19
| @ Philadelphia
| L 118–123 (OT)
|
|
|
| The Spectrum
| 19–6
|- align="center" bgcolor="#ccffcc"
| 26
| December 22
| Cleveland
| W 120–116
|
|
|
| Boston Garden
| 20–6
|- align="center" bgcolor="#ccffcc"
| 27
| December 26
| @ Kansas City
| W 124–119 (OT)
|
|
|
| Kemper Arena
| 21–6
|- align="center" bgcolor="#ffcccc"
| 28
| December 29
| @ Denver
| L 123–128
|
|
|
| McNichols Sports Arena
| 21–7
|- align="center" bgcolor="#ccffcc"
| 29
| December 30
| @ Utah
| W 121–110
|
|
|
| Salt Palace Acord Arena
| 22–7

|- align="center" bgcolor="#ccffcc"
| 30
| January 2
| @ Cleveland
| W 106–103
|
|
|
| Richfield Coliseum
| 22–8
|- align="center" bgcolor="#ffcccc"
| 31
| January 6
| Chicago
| L 102–116
|
|
|
| Boston Garden
| 23–8
|- align="center" bgcolor="#ccffcc"
| 32
| January 8
| Philadelphia
| W 96–90
|
|
|
| Boston Garden
| 24–8
|- align="center" bgcolor="#ccffcc"
| 33
| January 10
| Detroit
| W 134–124
|
|
|
| Hartford Civic Center
| 25–8
|- align="center" bgcolor="#ccffcc"
| 34
| January 11
| @ New Jersey
| W 112–94
|
|
|
| Brendan Byrne Arena
| 26–8
|- align="center" bgcolor="#ccffcc"
| 35
| January 13
| Atlanta
| W 116–95
|
|
|
| Boston Garden
| 27–8
|- align="center" bgcolor="#ffcccc"
| 36
| January 15
| @ Milwaukee
| L 118–122
|
|
|
| MECCA Arena
| 27–9
|- align="center" bgcolor="#ccffcc"
| 37
| January 16
| @ Detroit
| W 128–120
|
|
|
| Pontiac Silverdome
| 28–9
|- align="center" bgcolor="#ccffcc"
| 38
| January 19
| @ New York
| W 111–107
|
|
|
| Madison Square Garden
| 29–9
|- align="center" bgcolor="#ccffcc"
| 39
| January 20
| Indiana
| W 112–103
|
|
|
| Boston Garden
| 30–9
|- align="center" bgcolor="#ffcccc"
| 40
| January 22
| Seattle
| L 106–118
|
|
|
| Boston Garden
| 30–10
|- align="center" bgcolor="#ffcccc"
| 41
| January 24
| Portland
| L 119–123
|
|
|
| Boston Garden
| 30–11
|- align="center" bgcolor="#ccffcc"
| 42
| January 27
| New York
| W 131–99
|
|
|
| Boston Garden
| 31–11
|- align="center" bgcolor="#ccffcc"
| 43
| January 28
| @ Cleveland
| W 116–104
|
|
|
| Richfield Coliseum
| 32–11

|- align="center" bgcolor="#ccffcc"
| 44
| February 2
| @ Indiana
| W 109–105
|
|
|
| Market Square Arena
| 33–11
|- align="center" bgcolor="#ccffcc"
| 45
| February 5
| Denver
| W 145–144
|
|
|
| Boston Garden
| 34–11
|- align="center" bgcolor="#ffcccc"
| 46
| February 7
| Los Angeles
| L 113–119
|
|
|
| Boston Garden
| 34–12
|- align="center" bgcolor="#ffcccc"
| 47
| February 10
| @ Phoenix
| L 110–112
|
|
|
| Arizona Veterans Memorial Coliseum
| 34–13
|- align="center" bgcolor="#ccffcc"
| 48
| February 12
| @ San Diego
| W 129–116
|
|
|
| San Diego Sports Arena
| 35–13
|- align="center" bgcolor="#ccffcc"
| 49
| February 14
| @ Los Angeles
| W 108–103
|
|
|
| The Forum
| 36–13
|- align="center" bgcolor="#ffcccc"
| 50
| February 17
| @ Golden State
| L 105–121
|
|
|
| Oakland–Alameda County Coliseum Arena
| 36–14
|- align="center" bgcolor="#ccffcc"
| 51
| February 19
| @ Portland
| W 127–117
|
|
|
| Memorial Coliseum
| 37–14
|- align="center" bgcolor="#ffcccc"
| 52
| February 21
| @ Seattle
| L 100–103
|
|
|
| Kingdome
| 37–15
|- align="center" bgcolor="#ccffcc"
| 53
| February 24
| Utah
| W 132–90
|
|
|
| Boston Garden
| 38–15
|- align="center" bgcolor="#ccffcc"
| 54
| February 26
| San Diego
| W 122–110
|
|
|
| Boston Garden
| 39–15
|- align="center" bgcolor="#ccffcc"
| 55
| February 28
| Milwaukee
| W 106–102
|
|
|
| Boston Garden
| 40–15

|- align="center" bgcolor="#ccffcc"
| 56
| March 2
| @ Dallas
| W 101–97
|
|
|
| Reunion Arena
| 41–15
|- align="center" bgcolor="#ccffcc"
| 58
| March 5
| @ Houston
| W 100–98
|
|
|
| The Summit
| 43–15
|- align="center" bgcolor="#ccffcc"
| 59
| March 7
| New York
| W 107–106
|
|
|
| Boston Garden
| 44–15
|- align="center" bgcolor="#ccffcc"
| 60
| March 8
| @ Detroit
| W 111–101
|
|
|
| Pontiac Silverdome
| 45–15
|- align="center" bgcolor="#ccffcc"
| 61
| March 10
| Indiana
| W 121–100
|
|
|
| Boston Garden
| 46–15
|- align="center" bgcolor="#ccffcc"
| 62
| March 12
| @ New Jersey
| W 113–109
|
|
|
| Brendan Byrne Arena
| 47–15
|- align="center" bgcolor="#ccffcc"
| 63
| March 14
| Phoenix
| W 105–92
|
|
|
| Boston Garden
| 48–15
|- align="center" bgcolor="#ccffcc"
| 64
| March 16
| @ Washington
| W 98–97 (OT)
|
|
|
| Capital Centre
| 49–15
|- align="center" bgcolor="#ccffcc"
| 65
| March 17
| Atlanta
| W 113–109
|
|
|
| Boston Garden
| 50–15
|- align="center" bgcolor="#ccffcc"
| 67
| March 21
| @ Philadelphia
| W 123–111
|
|
|
| The Spectrum
| 52–15
|- align="center" bgcolor="#ccffcc"
| 68
| March 23
| @ Chicago
| W 110–103
|
|
|
| Chicago Stadium
| 53–15
|- align="center" bgcolor="#ccffcc"
| 69
| March 24
| Cleveland
| W 136–115
|
|
|
| Boston Garden
| 54–15
|- align="center" bgcolor="#ccffcc"
| 70
| March 26
| Detroit
| W 125–104
|
|
|
| Boston Garden
| 55–15
|- align="center" bgcolor="#ffcccc"
| 71
| March 28
| Philadelphia
| L 98–116
|
|
|
| Boston Garden
| 55–16
|- align="center" bgcolor="#ccffcc"
| 72
| March 31
| Washington
| W 119–109
|
|
|
| Boston Garden
| 56–16

|- align="center" bgcolor="#ccffcc"
| 73
| April 2
| @ Atlanta
| W 110–107
|
|
|
| The Omni
| 57–16
|- align="center" bgcolor="#ccffcc"
| 74
| April 4
| Chicago
| W 114–112
|
|
|
| Boston Garden
| 58–16
|- align="center" bgcolor="#ffcccc"
| 75
| April 6
| @ Milwaukee
| L 116–122
|
|
|
| MECCA Arena
| 58–17
|- align="center" bgcolor="#ccffcc"
| 76
| April 8
| @ New York
| W 110–106
|
|
|
| Madison Square Garden
| 59–17
|- align="center" bgcolor="#ccffcc"
| 77
| April 9
| New Jersey
| W 106–103
|
|
|
| Boston Garden
| 60–17
|- align="center" bgcolor="#ccffcc"
| 78
| April 11
| @ Philadelphia
| W 110–109 (OT)
|
|
|
| The Spectrum
| 61–17
|- align="center" bgcolor="#ffcccc"
| 79
| April 13
| @ Chicago
| L 115–120
|
|
|
| Chicago Stadium
| 61–18
|- align="center" bgcolor="#ccffcc"
| 80
| April 14
| Milwaukee
| W 100–91
|
|
|
| Boston Garden
| 62–18
|- align="center" bgcolor="#ffcccc"
| 81
| April 16
| @ New Jersey
| L 96–113
|
|
|
| Brendan Byrne Arena
| 62–19
|- align="center" bgcolor="#ccffcc"
| 82
| April 18
| New York
| W 119–99
|
|
|
| Boston Garden
| 63–19

Playoffs

|- align="center" bgcolor="#ccffcc"
| 1
| April 25
| Washington
| W 109–91
| M. L. Carr (21)
| Larry Bird (12)
| Tiny Archibald (7)
| Boston Garden15,320
| 1–0
|- align="center" bgcolor="#ffcccc"
| 2
| April 28
| Washington
| L 102–103
| Larry Bird (26)
| Bird, Parish (10)
| Tiny Archibald (6)
| Boston Garden15,320
| 1–1
|- align="center" bgcolor="#ccffcc"
| 3
| May 1
| @ Washington
| W 92–83
| Robert Parish (25)
| Parish, Archibald (13)
| Tiny Archibald (5)
| Capital Centre15,035
| 2–1
|- align="center" bgcolor="#ccffcc"
| 4
| May 2
| @ Washington
| W 103–99 (OT)
| Robert Parish (28)
| Robert Parish (15)
| Tiny Archibald (4)
| Capital Centre16,295
| 3–1
|- align="center" bgcolor="#ccffcc"
| 5
| May 5
| Washington
| W 131–126 (2OT)
| Robert Parish (33)
| Robert Parish (13)
| Tiny Archibald (11)
| Boston Garden15,320
| 4–1
|-

|- align="center" bgcolor="#ccffcc"
| 1
| May 9
| Philadelphia
| W 121–81
| Bird, Parish (24)
| Larry Bird (15)
| Larry Bird (10)
| Boston Garden15,320
| 1–0
|- align="center" bgcolor="#ffcccc"
| 2
| May 12
| Philadelphia
| L 113–121
| Tiny Archibald (24)
| Larry Bird (14)
| Tiny Archibald (13)
| Boston Garden15,320
| 1–1
|- align="center" bgcolor="#ffcccc"
| 3
| May 15
| @ Philadelphia
| L 97–99
| Cedric Maxwell (18)
| Larry Bird (13)
| Larry Bird (11)
| Spectrum18,364
| 1–2
|- align="center" bgcolor="#ffcccc"
| 4
| May 16
| @ Philadelphia
| L 94–119
| Robert Parish (18)
| Larry Bird (9)
| Gerald Henderson (7)
| Spectrum18,364
| 1–3
|- align="center" bgcolor="#ccffcc"
| 5
| May 19
| Philadelphia
| W 114–85
| Robert Parish (26)
| Larry Bird (20)
| Larry Bird (8)
| Boston Garden15,320
| 2–3
|- align="center" bgcolor="#ccffcc"
| 6
| May 21
| @ Philadelphia
| W 88–75
| Kevin McHale (17)
| Larry Bird (17)
| Danny Ainge (7)
| Spectrum18,364
| 3–3
|- align="center" bgcolor="#ffcccc"
| 7
| May 23
| Philadelphia
| L 106–120
| Robert Parish (23)
| Robert Parish (14)
| Larry Bird (9)
| Boston Garden15,320
| 3–4
|-

References

Awards and honors
 Larry Bird, All-NBA First Team

See also
 1981–82 NBA season

Boston Celtics seasons
Boston Celtics
Boston Celtics
Boston Celtics
Celtics
Celtics